My Two Wives is an Australian situation comedy series produced by Gary Reilly Productions in 1992.

The situation of My Two Wives involved a divorced man who moves into an apartment with his new wife and her daughter, only to learn that his ex-wife resides in the apartment directly below.

The cast included Peter Fisher, Patrick Ward, Linda Newton, Morna Seres, Kym Valentine, Brett Blewitt.

The series debuted in Australia 8 September 1992. Only a moderate ratings success, the program was not renewed beyond its initial series of 13 half-hour episodes.

The series was shown on Carlton Select for a time between 1996 and 1997.

References

External links 

 

Australian television sitcoms
Nine Network original programming
1992 Australian television series debuts
1992 Australian television series endings